The Goliath Rapid is a lorry made by Bremer Kühlerfabrik Borgward & Co. GmbH in Sebaldsbrück (a neighborhood in Hemelingen, a suburb of Bremen, Germany). The Rapid, which technically was an improved version of the Goliath Blitzkarren, was sold under the Goliath brand name. Bordward's radiator-producing company was later renamed to Goliath-Werke Borgward & Co. GmbH.

The Rapid consists of two parts: A "cart"-like front with two steerable wheels, and a "motorcycle" rear part with a single wheel. Between cart a motorcycle, it has an orthogonal wall and a steering wheel, to control the front wheels. A windshield was offered as a factory option. The Rapid has an electric starter, a clutch, and a 3-speed gearbox with a single reverse gear. Electric lamps including a stoplight were offered as a factory option that cost RM 170; an electric horn was offered for RM 30. The maximum permissible payload is 250 kg. The Rapid is powered by an ILO-Motorenwerke-made 198 cc, single cylinder, two-stroke-engine that produces 4 PS. In 1928, a new model with an increased payload of up to 300 kg and a 250 cc, 5.5 PS engine was put into production. In 1931, the payload was increased to 500 kg. A version with a framed flatbed was offered for RM 1100; a closed freight box version was available as well, for RM 1200. Odometer or a passenger seat also offered from the factory. Carl Borgward had filed a patent on "single rear wheel drive technology". The patent was granted on 8 August 1928.

Goliath Standard 
In addition to the Rapid, a 500 kg freight version called Goliath Standard was put into production. It has a 350 cc single cylinder, two-stroke gasoline engine made by ILO-Motorenwerke with a rated power of 7.5 PS. Its flatbed version cost RM 1295, the "closed freight-box" version was offered for RM 1440. The Standard's top speed is 40 km/h (25 mph).

In 1931, a 750 kg freight version with a 400 cc two cylinder engine rated 9 PS cc was introduced. In 1931, prices rose to RM 1600 resp. RM 1750.

In 1933, the Standard production was ceased – the successors Goliath F200 and F400 were put into production in autumn of 1933.

Competitors 
 Oscar Vidal & Sohn Tempo Pony, T1 and T2, built from 1928 to 1930, a very similar vehicle
 D-Lieferwagen L-7, 1927–1930
 Later in 1932–1934, BMW produced a similar freight cart an sold it as BMW F 76 and F 79 with bigger engine. It included a passenger seat.
 Rollfix record, also late for the market
 In late 1940s til 1952 Innocenti produced the Lambretta models FA, FB and FC
 Tatra 49, 1929–1930

References

External links 
 Volker Schacht: A Goliath Rapid/Standard at the 27th International Threecycle Meeting 2015, YouTube, 24 June 2015
 List of remaining Goliath vehicles , retrieved February 2019
 Sales brochure of the Goliath Rapid/Standard

Goliath vehicles
Three-wheeled motor vehicles